Dr. Ko Chung Sen (born 1968) is a Malaysian surgeon and politician of Chinese descent. He was the Perak State Legislative Assemblyman for Kepayang from 2018 to 2022. He is a member of the Democratic Action Party (DAP), a component in the Pakatan Harapan (PH) coalition. A surgeon by profession, he received BAO cum laude from Trinity College in Dublin. He became a fellow of the Royal College of Surgeons in Ireland in 1999.

Ko returned to Malaysia to work as a Consultant Cardiothoracic Surgeon in Penang General Hospital in 2001 and worked there until 2004. He then moved to Ipoh to work in KPJ Specialist Hospital and has been there since then.

He was elected to the parliament for Kampar constituency in the 2013 election. As candidate of the DAP, he  defeated Malaysian Chinese Association (MCA) incumbent Lee Chee Leong. In the 2018 election, was picked as candidate for Perak state seat of Kepayang which he had won and got to be its state assemblyman.

Election results

References

1968 births
Living people
People from Kuala Lumpur
Malaysian politicians of Chinese descent
Democratic Action Party (Malaysia) politicians
Members of the Dewan Rakyat
Members of the Perak State Legislative Assembly
Malaysian cardiac surgeons
Fellows of the Royal College of Surgeons
Alumni of Trinity College Dublin
21st-century Malaysian politicians